Herbert Goodman (born August 31, 1977) is a retired American professional mixed martial artist and former NFL running back for the Green Bay Packers. A professional competitor from 2007 until 2011, Goodman competed for Bellator, M-1 Global and King of the Cage. He received his nickname, "Whisper" due to his soft-spoken personality.

Background
Goodman was born and raised in Miami, Florida, attending Homestead High School where he competed in track and field, becoming a two-time letter winner in the sport and also placed third in the state long jump during his senior year. Goodman began playing football during his senior year of high school, and then continued with the sport for the two years 1998-1999 at Graceland College (NAIA) in Lamoni, Iowa, where he rushed for 2,385 yards before he was signed by the Green Bay Packers of the NFL as an undrafted free agent in 2000.

NFL career
Goodman played two seasons in the National Football League (NFL) as a running back and kick returner for the Green Bay Packers, appearing in 12 games during the 2000 and 2001 seasons. He ran the ball four times for -3 yards and returned five kickoffs for 150 yards.  He also fumbled twice. Goodman was allocated to NFL Europe in 2002 where he started for the Scottish Claymores, rushing for 873 yards to lead the league and also surpass Siran Stacy's single season team rushing record. After his stint in the NFL, Goodman also was a member of various teams' practice squads, played in the CFL, and also played semi-professionally in Wisconsin. He eventually retired in 2005 after suffering a knee injury in the CFL.

Mixed martial arts career

Early career
Goodman started his professional mixed martial arts career in 2007.  He fought Hector Lombard at Bellator 24 and lost via first-round KO.

Combat USA
Goodman fought Will Dicke in the Wisconsin State semifinals and won via unanimous decision to move on to the Wisconsin State finals. He fought Gerald Meerschaert in the Wisconsin State finals and won via submission (rear-naked choke) to become the Middleweight State Champion of Wisconsin.

Goodman was supposed to face Louis Taylor, the Middleweight State Champion of Illinois, on July 16, 2011 at Combat USA Wisconsin vs. Illinois but Taylor dropped out of the fight just 2 hours before the weigh-ins with a bruised leg.

Mixed martial arts record

|-
| Win
| align=center| 19–11
| Jonas Billstein
| DQ (illegal soccer kick)
| Bellator 58
| 
| align=center| 2
| align=center| 3:21
| Hollywood, Florida, United States
| 
|-
| Loss
| align=center| 18–11
| Isaiah Larson
| Decision (unanimous)
| Riot at the Hyatt: Packer vs. Viking
| 
| align=center| 3
| align=center| 5:00
| Minneapolis, Minnesota, United States
| 
|-
| Win
| align=center| 18–10
| Gerald Meerschaert
| Submission (rear-naked choke)
| Combat USA Fighting Championships
| 
| align=center| 1
| align=center| 1:28
| Green Bay, Wisconsin, United States
| 
|-
| Win
| align=center| 17–10
| Will Dicke
| Decision (unanimous)
| Combat USA: Best 8 in the State 2 
| 
| align=center| 3
| align=center| 5:00
| Green Bay, Wisconsin, United States
| 
|-
| Loss
| align=center| 16–10
| Forrest Petz
| Decision (unanimous)
| Ultimate Cage Battle: Pride & Glory
| 
| align=center| 3
| align=center| 5:00
| Parma, Ohio, United States
| 
|-
| Loss
| align=center| 16–9
| Hector Lombard
| KO (punches)
| Bellator 24 
| 
| align=center| 1
| align=center| 0:38
| Hollywood, Florida, United States
| 
|-
| Win
| align=center| 16–8
| Mike Suttles
| TKO (punches)
| CCFP: Cool City Fight Promotions
| 
| align=center| 1
| align=center| 1:27
| Rockwood, Wisconsin, United States
| 
|-
| Loss
| align=center| 15–8
| Jason Norwood
| Decision (unanimous)
| FCF: Freestyle Cage Fighting 43 
| 
| align=center| 3
| align=center| 5:00
| Shawnee, Oklahoma, United States
| 
|-
| Win
| align=center| 15–7
| Dante Rivera
| Decision (unanimous)
| Adrenaline: New Breed 
| 
| align=center| 3
| align=center| 5:00
| Atlantic City, New Jersey, United States
|Won the vacant New Breed Fighters Middleweight Championship.
|-
| Win
| align=center| 14–7
| David Kleczkowski
| Submission (guillotine choke)
| ECO: Extreme Cagefighting Organization 3 
| 
| align=center| 1
| align=center| 1:19
| Baraboo, Wisconsin, United States
| 
|-
| Win
| align=center| 13–7
| Chris Krueger
| Submission (arm triangle choke)
| IFC: Wiuff vs. Newcomb 
| 
| align=center| 1
| align=center| 0:58
| Green Bay, Wisconsin, United States
| 
|-
| Win
| align=center| 12–7
| Joseph Reyes
| Submission
| MFC: Maximo Fighting Championship 
| 
| align=center| 1
| align=center| 1:28
| Isla Verde, Carolina
| 
|-
| Win
| align=center| 11–7
| James Brasco
| TKO (punches)
| Shine Fights 2: ATT vs. The World 
| 
| align=center| 3
| align=center| 3:24
| Miami, Florida, United States
| 
|-
| Loss
| align=center| 10–7
| Lucas Lopes
| Decision (unanimous)
| Headhunter Productions: The Patriot Act 2 
| 
| align=center| 3
| align=center| 5:00
| Columbia, Missouri, United States
| 
|-
| Win
| align=center| 10–6
| Jordan Radev
| KO (punches)
| M-1 Challenge: 2009 Selections 3
| 
| align=center| 2
| align=center| 4:59
| Bourgas, Bulgaria
| 
|-
| Loss
| align=center| 9–6
| Ronald Stallings
| KO (knees)
| UWC 5: Man O' War
| 
| align=center| 1
| align=center| 4:56
| Fairfax, Virginia, United States
| 
|-
| Win
| align=center| 9–5
| Marcus Reynolds
| Decision (unanimous)
| KOTC: Level One
| 
| align=center| 3
| align=center| 3:00
| Lac du Flambeau, Wisconsin, United States
| 
|-
| Loss
| align=center| 8–5
| Mark Palbykin
| Decision (unanimous)
| CCC: Cage Conflict Championships 
| 
| align=center| 3
| align=center| 5:00
| Menasha, Wisconsin, United States
| 
|-
| Loss
| align=center| 8–4
| Kenny Robertson
| Submission (armbar)
| Combat USA: Battle in the Bay 7 
| 
| align=center| 3
| align=center| N/A
| Green Bay, Wisconsin, United States
| 
|-
| Win
| align=center| 8–3
| Adrian Serrano
| KO
| GFS: Thunderdome 
| 
| align=center| 2
| align=center| 1:02
| Wisconsin, United States
| 
|-
| Win
| align=center| 7–3
| Roger Krahl
| TKO (corner stoppage)
| R.F.C. 1: Revolution Fight Club 1 
| 
| align=center| 1
| align=center| 5:00
| Fort Lauderdale, Florida, United States
| 
|-
| Win
| align=center| 6–3
| Andrew Urban
| Submission (kimura)
| KTK: Konquer the Kage 19 
| 
| align=center| 3
| align=center| 2:20
| Oshkosh, Wisconsin, United States
| 
|-
| Win
| align=center| 5–3
| Matt Scaggs
| Submission (strikes)
| TCC: Carnage in the Cage 
| 
| align=center| 1
| align=center| N/A
| Green Bay, Wisconsin, United States
| 
|-
| Loss
| align=center| 4–3
| Héctor Urbina
| Decision (unanimous) 
| KOTC: Sub Zero
| 
| align=center| 3
| align=center| 3:00
| Lac Du Flambeau, Wisconsin, United States
| 
|-
| Loss
| align=center| 4–2
| Chris Baten
| TKO
| UWC 2: Ultimate Warrior Challenge 
| 
| align=center| 2
| align=center| 1:57
| Jacksonville, Florida, United States
| 
|-
| Win
| align=center| 4–1
| Shane DeZee
| Submission (guillotine choke)
| MMAC: The Revolution 
| 
| align=center| 1
| align=center| 0:36
| DC Armory, Washington D.C.
| 
|-
| Loss
| align=center| 3–1
| John Krohn
| Submission (armbar)
| SF 19: Cinco de Mayhem 
| 
| align=center| 3
| align=center| 2:10
| Portland, Oregon, United States
| 
|-
| Win
| align=center| 3–0
| Eric Manley
| TKO
| KSP: Ken Shamrock Productions 
| 
| align=center| 2
| align=center| N/A
| Redding, California, United States
| 
|-
| Win
| align=center| 2–0
| Randall Lamonte
| Submission (guillotine choke)
| KSP: Fight at the Falls 
| 
| align=center| 1
| align=center| N/A
| Oroville, California, United States
| 
|-
| Win
| align=center| 1–0
| Tim Nixon
| KO (punches)
| Gladiators Fighting Series: Super Brawl 
| 
| align=center| 2
| align=center| 0:30
| United States
|

References

External links
 

Living people
1977 births
Sportspeople from Miami
American male mixed martial artists
Mixed martial artists from Florida
Middleweight mixed martial artists
African-American mixed martial artists
American football running backs
Green Bay Packers players
Scottish Claymores players
Graceland Yellowjackets football players
21st-century African-American sportspeople
20th-century African-American sportspeople
Players of American football from Miami